Edward Abdullai Mobalaji Olatunji Afo Oshodi (born 14 January 1992) is an English semi-professional footballer who plays as a defender for Hendon.

He began his career at Watford in the Championship and spent time on loan at Dagenham & Redbridge and Rushden & Diamonds before moving to Forest Green Rovers in 2011.

In 2015, Oshodi announced his retirement from the game at the age of 23, but returned to playing at semi-professional level shortly thereafter, signing for Hemel Hempstead Town and then St Albans City.

He represented England U16, U17 and C at international level.

Club career

Watford
Oshodi started his career with Watford's youth system. His first involvement with the first team came when he was named on the bench for a 1–0 League Cup third round win over Premier League side West Ham United on 23 September 2008. He made his first team debut for Watford during the 2009–10 season on 29 September in a 3–2 Championship home defeat against Coventry City, replacing the injured Lee Hodson as a substitute in the 78th minute. He was still an academy scholar at the time.

On 25 November 2010, Oshodi signed on loan for League One side Dagenham & Redbridge until January 2011. He joined Conference side Rushden & Diamonds on a three-month loan on 24 January 2011. He scored his first senior career goal on 22 February 2011, in a 2–0 Conference win against Eastbourne Borough. He made 12 appearances during his time with the club.

Forest Green Rovers
On 7 October 2011, Oshodi signed for Conference side Forest Green Rovers, who were managed by his former youth team coach at Watford, Dave Hockaday, on a two-year deal. He made his Forest Green debut the next day in a 0–0 away draw against Fleetwood Town.

In August 2012, Oshodi was named Forest Green captain at the age of 20 for the beginning of the 2012–13 season. He scored his first goal for the club on 4 September 2012 in a home win against Ebbsfleet United. In January 2013 he agreed a new two-and-a-half-year extension to his contract. In January 2014, he spent a week training with League One side Brentford, having played under manager Mark Warburton in the academy at Watford.

Oshodi made his hundredth league appearance for Forest Green on 8 April 2014 in a 1–1 draw with Kidderminster Harriers. His first appearance of the 2014–15 season saw him come on as a substitute on 86 minutes in a 2–0 win over FC Halifax Town on 13 September 2014. On 29 November 2014, he scored the opening goal, as well as an own goal, in a 2–1 win over Dartford.

On 2 February 2015, Oshodi revealed that he was stepping away from football to focus on his charity work and that he had come to a mutual agreement to leave Forest Green.

Semi-professional football
Oshodi signed for Conference South side Hemel Hempstead Town in March 2015. He was sent off in successive months for Hemel in October 2015, and left the club in November with manager Dean Brennan saying he needed to "balance the books". In December 2015 Oshodi signed for another National League South side, St Albans City.

Wealdstone FC
Osodi signed for Wealdstone in the summer of 2016 and played two seasons with the club making over 50 league appearances before retiring in May 2018.

Hendon
In December 2019, Oshodi joined Hendon FC.

International career
Oshodi is eligible to play for England and Nigeria. Oshodi represented the England U16 and U17 teams and made three appearances at the 2009 European U17 Championship, as England crashed out in the group stage. In February 2012, Oshodi was called up to the England C team for a 2011–13 International Challenge Trophy match against Italy Lega Pro and played the full 90 minutes of the 1–1 draw. He then earned another call up to the England C squad in August 2012 for another 2011–13 International Challenge Trophy match against Belgium U23. Oshodi played the full 90 minutes in a 2–1 win over Belgium to earn his second cap.

Career statistics

References

1992 births
Living people
Footballers from the London Borough of Brent
English people of Nigerian descent
English footballers
England youth international footballers
Association football defenders
Watford F.C. players
Dagenham & Redbridge F.C. players
Rushden & Diamonds F.C. players
Forest Green Rovers F.C. players
Hemel Hempstead Town F.C. players
St Albans City F.C. players
Wealdstone F.C. players
Hendon F.C. players
English Football League players
National League (English football) players
Black British sportspeople
England semi-pro international footballers
English people of Yoruba descent
Yoruba sportspeople